Gosavianadzor (Госавианадзор) can refer to:
The State Aviation Safety Supervision Agency, a division of the Federal Service for Supervision of Transport
State Supervisory Commission for Flight Safety of the Soviet Union